Pseucoleucania is a genus of moth of the family Noctuidae.

References
Natural History Museum Lepidoptera genus database

Noctuidae